North Adelaide railway station is located on the Gawler line in the inner northern Adelaide suburb of North Adelaide.

History
North Adelaide station opened in 1857 with a station building (including a waiting room, ladies waiting room and ticket office) and attached four room residence and garden. The enclosed garden still contains mature exotic trees including cotoneaster, phoenix palm and orange. The building is the third oldest surviving railway station in South Australia and distinct from the earlier 1856 Bowden and Alberton stations, having an attached residence. The buildings are classed as historic and listed on the Register of the National Estate. After Bowden, Alberton and St Kilda railway station, Melbourne, it is the fourth oldest railway station in Australia.

There is also an outbuilding to the north. In 1878 the windows, doors and west facing verandah over the platform were altered. In 1880 a signal box was erected south of the station building at the end of the platform, but this has since been demolished. In 1940, most trains stopped or could be requested to stop at North Adelaide. In 1969, all trains except express trains stopped here every day. In the late 1980s, the Adelaide bound platform was shortened. The station was closed for a brief period in the 1990s, having declined into a bad state of repair. The structure on the Gawler bound platform was burnt down and replaced by the present shelter.

There were sidings and a wood yard selling firewood west of this platform where the standard gauge line to Darwin now runs. Special event trains for the annual Skyshow fireworks previously used this station as a terminus. When the Schützenfest is held at the nearby Bonython Park in January each year, most trains stop at this station. In January 2013, North Adelaide station became the temporary terminus of the Gawler Central line while Adelaide station was closed for a month. The station is no longer staffed, and the building is owned and managed by the City of Adelaide. In recent times the station building was used for housing a community group, Bicycle SA (1996-circa 2004).

Services by platform
North Adelaide station is only served by a limited number of trains stop at this station between 06:00 and 09:45, and 13:30 and 19:00 on weekdays only.

Gallery

References

Further reading

External links

Railway stations in Adelaide
Railway stations in Australia opened in 1857
South Australian Heritage Register
North Adelaide